A number of ships of the French Navy have borne the name Provence in honour of the province. Among them:

 , a 64-gun ship of the line
 , an 80-gun ship of the line, launched as Hercule was renamed Provence during the Bourbon Restoration
  (1855), a steamer brig 
  (1863), a Flandre-class armoured frigate
  (1912), a  battleship
  (2013), the third French Aquitaine-class FREMM multipurpose frigate (Provence)

See also
 , an ocean liner sunk in World War I while transporting troops

Sources 
 

French Navy ship names